Kanthi railway station is a railway station on the Tamluk–Digha branch line of South Eastern Railway zone of Indian Railways. The railway station is situated beside Kanthi Bypass Road at Contai in Purba Medinipur district in the Indian state of West Bengal. The distance between Howrah and this railway station is approximately 152 km. Number of Express and passengers trains stop at Kanthi railway station.

History
The Tamluk–Digha line was sanctioned in 1984–85 Railway Budget at an estimated cost of around Rs 74 crore. Finally this line was opened in 2004. This track including Kanthi railway station was electrified in 2012–13.

References

Railway stations in Purba Medinipur district
Kharagpur railway division
Kolkata Suburban Railway stations